Simón Vanderhoeght Santos (born 5 June 1986 in Maldonado) is a Uruguayan footballer currently playing for Dender EH in the Belgian Third Division.

Early life
Vanderhoeght was born in Maldonado, Uruguay. He is of Belgian ancestry, his grandfather came from there because he was against the Second World War. He holds Belgian passport.

Career
Vanderhoeght grew up from the youth levels of Atenas De San Carlos.

In January 2004, while playing the Punta Cup international youth tournament in Maldonado, Real Madrid's representatives put their eyes on him. He was offered a scholarship to train in Spain and they gie him the flight passages. However, there was a problem that prevented him to fulfill his dream. He had problems with papers of the Belgian passport and so he could not travel.

In January 2009, he went to try luck in Europe to play on the well known club Hellas Verona, which had to play in Serie C1 due to economical problems.

In early July 2015, Vanderhoeght departed again to Europe to play for Belgian side Dender EH.

References

External links
 
 
 

1986 births
Living people
People from Maldonado, Uruguay
Uruguayan footballers
Uruguayan people of Flemish descent
Association football midfielders
Atenas de San Carlos players
Montevideo Wanderers F.C. players
Hellas Verona F.C. players
Deportivo Maldonado players
FC Lustenau players
C.A. Bella Vista players
F.C.V. Dender E.H. players
Expatriate footballers in Italy
Expatriate footballers in Austria
Expatriate footballers in Belgium
Association football defenders